Ichneutica lignana is a moth of the family Noctuidae. It is endemic to New Zealand. This species is found on the Three Kings Islands as well as the North, South and Stewart Islands. This species lives in a variety of habitats including coastal areas, tussock grasslands, shrublands, and native forest, at a range of altitudes from sea level to over 1300 m. I. lignana is quite distinctive in appearance with its dark markings on the abdomen and forewings although it is possible to confuse Ichneutica morosa, Meterana pansicolor and Meterana pascoi with this species. Adults are on the wing throughout the year in the northern parts of the New Zealand but are restricted to the months of October to April in the more southern parts of the country.

Taxonomy 
This species was first described by Francis Walker in 1857 using a male specimen collected by Percy Earl in Waikouaiti. The male holotype specimen is held at the Natural History Museum, London. In 1988 J. S. Dugdale placed this species within the Graphania genus. In 2019 Robert Hoare undertook a major review of New Zealand Noctuidae. During this review the genus Ichneutica was greatly expanded and the genus Graphania was subsumed into that genus as a synonym. As a result of this review, this species is now known as Ichneutica lignana.

Description 

Morris Watt describes the egg of this species as follows:

Hoare described the larva as follows:

Walker described the adult of this species as follows:
The wingspan of the adult males are between 32 and 40 mm and the wingspan of the females are between 33 and 39 mm. This species is quite distinctive with its dark markings on the abdomen and forewings. It might possibly be confused with Ichneutica morosa, Meterana pansicolor and Meterana pascoi but I. lignana can be distinguished from these three species as they lack the distinct claviform present on I. lignana forewings.

Distribution 
It is endemic to New Zealand. This species is found on the Three Kings Islands as well as the North, South and Stewart Islands.

Habitat 
This species lives in a variety of habitats including coastal areas, tussock grasslands, shrublands, and native forest, at a range of altitudes from sea level to over 1300 m.

Behaviour 
Adults of this species are on the wing throughout the year in the northern parts of the New Zealand but are restricted to the months of October to April in the more southern parts of the country.

Life history and host species 

Eggs are laid in November and December and take around eleven days to incubate.  A larva of this species was found on Poa anceps and collected in December was successfully reared with the moth emerging in March. This larva pupated in moss. Other larval hosts are the native grasses Poa cita and Festuca novae-zelandiae.

References

Hadeninae
Moths of New Zealand
Moths described in 1857
Endemic fauna of New Zealand
Taxa named by Francis Walker (entomologist)
Endemic moths of New Zealand